Kate or Katie Lee may refer to:

Kate Lee (English singer) (1858–1904)
Kate Lee Ferguson (1841–1928), American novelist, poet, and composer
Kate Lee O'Connor (born 1992),  American singer, songwriter, fiddler
Katie Lee (chef) (born 1981), food critic, chef, and former wife of Billy Joel
Katie Lee (horse), New Zealand Thoroughbred racehorse
Katie Lee (lyricist)
Katie Lee (singer) (1919–2017), American folksinger, actress and writer
Katie Madonna Lee, American screenwriter and filmmaker

See also
Katie Lea or Katarina Waters (born 1980), German-born English professional wrestler
Kate Leigh (1881–1964), Australian criminal
Katie Leigh (born 1958), American voice actress
Kathy Lee (disambiguation)
Katherine Lee (disambiguation)